The Punjab Legislative Assembly election, 2007 was held in Indian state of Punjab in 2007, to elect 117 members to the Punjab Legislative Assembly. Shiromani Akali Dal, and its alliance partner Bharatiya Janata Party gained majority of the seats. Parkash Singh Badal was elected as the Chief Minister

Background 
2007 general elections in Punjab witnessed most closely fought elections in Indian National Congress and Shiromani Akali Dal. The turnout among 1.69 Crore eligible voters, which is 76% was exceptionally high compared to last elections.

The 2007 Punjab Assembly Elections at a Glance

Parties and Alliances



Others

Results 

|- align=center
!style="background-color:#E9E9E9" class="unsortable"|
!style="background-color:#E9E9E9" align=center|Political Party
!style="background-color:#E9E9E9" |No. of Candidates
!style="background-color:#E9E9E9" |Seats won
!style="background-color:#E9E9E9" |Number of Votes
!style="background-color:#E9E9E9" |% of Votes
|-
| 
|align="left"|Shiromani Akali Dal||93||48||4,689,018||37.09%
|-
| 
|align="left"|Indian National Congress||116||44||5,170,548||40.90%
|-
| 
|align="left"|Bharatiya Janata Party||23||19||1,046,451||8.28%
|-
| 
|align="left"|Independents||431||5||861,595||6.82%
|-
|
|align="left"|Total||1043||116|| 12,641,706||
|-
|}

Results by Region

Result by Constituency 

List of Successful Candidates in Punjab Assembly Election in 2007

Government Formation 
On March 2, 2007 Parkash Singh Badal took Oath for the record fourth time. With crowd gathered in the Mohali cricket stadium to attend the Oath Taking Ceremony.

See also 
 2002 Punjab Legislative Assembly election
 2012 Punjab Legislative Assembly election

References

Punjab
2007
2007